Elyounoussi (Arabic: اليونسي‎‎) is an Arabic surname that may refer to
Mamoun Elyounoussi (born 1987), Dutch actor of Moroccan descent
Mohamed Elyounoussi (born 1994), Norwegian football forward 
Tarik Elyounoussi (born 1988), Norwegian football player, cousin of Mohamed

Arabic-language surnames